John Augustus, Prince of Anhalt-Zerbst (29 July 1677 in Zerbst – 7 November 1742 in Zerbst), was a German prince of the House of Ascania and ruler of the principality of Anhalt-Zerbst.

He was the eldest son of Karl William, Prince of Anhalt-Zerbst, by his wife Sophie, daughter of August, Duke of Saxe-Weissenfels.

Life

In 1718, after the death of Karl William, John Augustus became prince of Anhalt-Zerbst.

John Augustus married Fredericka (b. Gotha, 24 March 1675; d. Karlsbad, 28 May 1709), daughter of Frederick I, Duke of Saxe-Gotha-Altenburg, on 25 May 1702 in Zerbst. They had no children. He married a second time to Hedwig Fredericka (b. Weiltingen, 18 October 1691; d. Zerbst, 14 August 1752), daughter of Frederick Ferdinand, Duke of Württemberg-Weiltingen (a grandson of Julius Frederick, Duke of Württemberg-Weiltingen), on 8 October 1715 in Zerbst. This union was also childless.

Since John Augustus died without issue, the elder line of Anhalt-Zerbst became extinct. On his death, he was succeeded by his first cousins, the princes of Anhalt-Dornburg.

Ancestry

References 
 Ferdinand Siebigk: Johann August, Fürst von Anhalt-Zerbst. In: Allgemeine Deutsche Biographie (ADB). Band 14, Duncker & Humblot, Leipzig 1881, S. 118 f.

John Augustus
1677 births
1742 deaths